Solidago microglossa  is a South American plant species in the family Asteraceae. It is native to Brazil, Bolivia, Paraguay, Uruguay, and northern Argentina.

Solidago microglossa is a perennial herb up to 100 cm (40 inches) tall, spreading by means of underground rhizomes. The leaves are thin and lance-shaped, up to 7 cm (2.8 inches) long; leaves get progressively smaller higher up on the stem. One plant can produce many small yellow flower heads in a large, branching, conical array at the top of the plant.

References

External links
Photo of herbarium specimen at Missouri Botanical Garden, collected in State of Paraná in Brail in 1976

microglossa
Plants described in 1836
Flora of South America